O Jong-yeol (also known as Oh Jong-yul or Oh Jong-jul, born 2 October 1961) is a South Korean sailor. He competed in the Flying Dutchman event at the 1988 Summer Olympics.

References

External links
 
 

1961 births
Living people
South Korean male sailors (sport)
Olympic sailors of South Korea
Sailors at the 1988 Summer Olympics – Flying Dutchman
Place of birth missing (living people)